Itarana is a municipality located in the Brazilian state of Espírito Santo. Its population was 10,494 (2020) and its area is 296 km².

References

Municipalities in Espírito Santo